Beaussais-Vitré is a commune in the Deux-Sèvres department in Nouvelle-Aquitaine region in western France. It is the result of the merger, on 1 January 2013, of the communes of Beaussais and Vitré.

See also
Communes of the Deux-Sèvres department

References

Communes of Deux-Sèvres
Populated places established in 2013